Michele Vargas (born March 2, 1985) is a Dominican-American model and telenovela actress.

Biography
Michele Vargas was born in San Francisco de Macorís, Dominican Republic in 1985 and grew up in New York City in the well known neighborhood of Washington Heights. Her fame soared when she won the Telemundo reality show Protagonistas de Novela 2 in Miami, Florida. After winning she moved to Mexico to study performing arts, acting, cinema and other courses related to television and film. Plus perfected her skills in singing and music history. While living in Mexico, she worked in the Spanish-language novela Los Plateados, after three years in Mexico she decided to return to Miami to continue her acting career.

Telemundo hired her as an exclusive actress of the Network and she then  appeared in successful novelas such as Decisiones, La Viuda de Blanco, Mas Sabe el Diablo, Aurora just to name a few. She participated in Univision Network novela Talisman and began reviewing projects for 2013.

Her model experience includes commercials for companies such as Nike, Cyber Computers, Domino's Pizza, Colgate, Aquafina, Dove and Unefon.

Filmography

References

External links
 

1985 births
Living people
American actresses
Dominican Republic emigrants to the United States
21st-century American women